Hereroa is a genus of flowering plants belonging to the family Aizoaceae.

Its native range is Southern Africa.

Species:

Hereroa acuminata 
Hereroa aspera 
Hereroa brevifolia 
Hereroa calycina 
Hereroa carinans 
Hereroa concava 
Hereroa crassa 
Hereroa fimbriata 
Hereroa glenensis 
Hereroa gracilis 
Hereroa granulata 
Hereroa herrei 
Hereroa hesperantha 
Hereroa incurva 
Hereroa joubertii 
Hereroa latipetala 
Hereroa muirii 
Hereroa nelii 
Hereroa odorata 
Hereroa pallens 
Hereroa puttkameriana 
Hereroa rehneltiana 
Hereroa stanfordiae 
Hereroa stenophylla 
Hereroa tenuifolia 
Hereroa teretifolia 
Hereroa willowmorensis 
Hereroa wilmaniae

References

Aizoaceae
Aizoaceae genera